The following lists events that happened during 2023 in the Maldives.

Incumbents
President: Ibrahim Mohamed Solih
Vice President: Faisal Naseem

Events
2023 Maldivian presidential election

References

 
2020s in the Maldives
Years of the 21st century in the Maldives
Maldives
Maldives